Cloonacool is a Gaelic Athletic Association club based in south County Sligo, Republic of Ireland.

The club marked its centenary in 2016, including by publishing a book with research extracted from newspapers and national archives.

Honours
 Sligo Intermediate Football Championship (1): 1997
 Sligo Intermediate Football League Division 3 (ex Div. 2) (2): 1999, 2011

References

Gaelic games clubs in County Sligo